

Television

Radio

References

Big 12 men's basketball tournament
Big 12 Tournament finals
CBS Sports
ESPN College Basketball